Micah Smaldone (born 1978) is an American singer, songwriter and guitarist based in Maine. He was a member of several New England area bands, and is best known for the solo music made under his given name, Micah Blue Smaldone.

Career
Smaldone was a founding member of the Pinkerton Thugs, an anarchist street punk band that played an integral part in the mid-1990s Boston punk revival. He played in several other bands of different styles prior to becoming a solo performer around the turn of the century.

Built upon a foundation of fingerstyle Piedmont Blues guitar, Smaldone's solo efforts have expanded over the years into full-band accompaniment, both acoustic and electric, and often vivid, harrowing lyrics.

To date he has released four solo studio albums, and has toured regularly across United States and Europe.

Discography

Micah Blue Smaldone
Some Sweet Day CD (2004) (  North East Indie Records )
Hither & Thither CD/LP (2005) (  North East Indie Records /Tequila Sunrise)
Live In Belgium CD (2007) (  North East Indie Records )
The Red River CD/LP (2008) (Immune Recordings)
split release with Big Blood LP (2012) (Immune Recordings)
Ring of the Rise CD/LP (2013) (Immune Recordings)
Time/Soft Eyes 7" single (2013) (2000 Records)

Collaborations
Death Vessel - Stay Close CD/LP (2005) (  North East Indie Records /Immune Recordings) (guitar, vocals)
Jack Rose - Dr. Ragtime and His Pals CD/LP (2008) (Beautiful Happiness/Tequila Sunrise) (guitar)
Fire on Fire - the Orchard (2008) (Young God Records) (upright bass, banjo, vocals)
Asa Irons - Knife Gift Debt (2013) (Turned Word Records/Laughable Recordings) (upright bass, vocals, production)

Compilations
Folk Music for the End of the World CD (2007) (Yer Bird Records)
Open Strings - Early Virtuoso Recordings From The Middle East, And New Responses CD/LP (2009) (Honest John's Recordings) 
Imaginational Anthem, Vol IV CD/LP (2010) (Tompkins Square)
La Ballade du beau regard 2x10" (2013) (Okraina Records)

References

External links

Label website
WBUR feature on Smaldone
NPR feature on Smaldone
Interview, Americana-UK
Review, BBC Music

1978 births
Living people
Musicians from Portland, Maine
Guitarists from Maine
21st-century American guitarists